The Journal of Psychiatric Practice is a bimonthly peer-reviewed medical review journal covering psychiatry. It was established in 1995 as the Journal of Practical Psychiatry and Behavioral Health, obtaining its current name in 2000. It is published by Lippincott Williams & Wilkins and the editor-in-chief is John M. Oldham (Baylor College of Medicine). According to the Journal Citation Reports, the journal has a 2017 impact factor of 1.722.

References

External links

Lippincott Williams & Wilkins academic journals
Publications established in 1995
Psychiatry journals
Bimonthly journals
English-language journals
Review journals